Murray Edwards may refer to:

N. Murray Edwards, Canadian businessman and co-owner of the Calgary Flames
Murray Edwards College, Cambridge, a women's college in England